Chad Thomas Salisbury (born July 21, 1976) is a former Arena Football League quarterback. He was formerly the quarterbacks and wide receivers coach for the Los Angeles Avengers. Salisbury is currently the Offensive Cordinator for the California University of Pennsylvania Vulcans football team

High school and college careers
Salisbury attended Frazier High School, where he played football, basketball, and baseball. While there, he was a two-time All-State selection in football and basketball. After high school, he went to play football for both New Mexico State and Buffalo. He earned honorable mention All-America honors from the Football Gazette after the 1997 season.

College career statistics

Professional career
In his Arena Football League career, Salisbury played for five teams, but spent time with six total. He first joined the AFL with the New England Sea Wolves and moved with the team to  Toronto when they became the Phantoms. He then played two seasons with the Chicago Rush. He played one season with the Columbus Destroyers, and was on the Georgia Force's practice squad before he finished his career by playing two seasons with the Grand Rapids Rampage.

Career statistics

Coaching career
On August 25, 2007, Salisbury retired after sustaining a concussion. However, he still continued in football as a coach and athletic director at Byron Center High School. In August 2008, Salisbury was hired to the coaching staff of the Los Angeles Avengers to be the quarterbacks and wide receivers coach. Preceding his time as an Arena League Football coach Salisbury began his tenure at California University Of Pennsylvania as the Vulcans' Quarterbacks Coach. Prior to the start of the 2016 football season, Salisbury was promoted to the Vulcans' offensive coordinator position. During Salisbury's first season as offensive coordinator, The Vulcans' completed an undefeated regular season. The Vulcans compete at the NCAA Division II level and are a member of the Pennsylvania State Athletic Conference.

Personal
Salisbury's nickname is "Big Country". His daughter's name, Braylin, was chosen after he heard former Michigan wide receiver Braylon Edwards' name numerous times while watching the 2004 Michigan-Michigan State game. His newest addition to the family is his second daughter Madalyn. On March 17, 2018, Salisbury married his fiancé Julie at a wedding ceremony held at the Southpoint Golf Club in Washington County, Pennsylvania.

References

External links
 Profile at CBSSports.com
 California (PA) profile

1976 births
Living people
American football quarterbacks
Buffalo Bulls football players
California Vulcans football coaches
Chicago Rush players
Columbus Destroyers players
Georgia Force players
Grand Rapids Rampage players
Los Angeles Avengers coaches
New England Sea Wolves players
New Mexico State Aggies football players
Toronto Phantoms players
People from Fayette County, Pennsylvania
Players of American football from Pennsylvania